The enzyme alkylacetylglycerophosphatase (EC 3.1.3.59) catalyzes the reaction

1-alkyl-2-acetyl-sn-glycero-3-phosphate + H2O  1-alkyl-2-acetyl-sn-glycerol + phosphate

This enzyme belongs to the family of hydrolases, specifically those acting on phosphoric monoester bonds.  The systematic name is 1-alkyl-2-acetyl-sn-glycero-3-phosphate phosphohydrolase. Other names in common use include 1-alkyl-2-lyso-sn-glycero-3-P:acetyl-CoA acetyltransferase, and alkylacetylglycerophosphate phosphatase.  This enzyme participates in ether lipid metabolism.

References

 

EC 3.1.3
Enzymes of unknown structure